Otocinclus batmani is a species of armored catfish (Loricariidae) native to South America.

It is named for the comic-book hero Batman, who had a bat shape for a symbol, 
and has  the pigmented mark on its caudal fin, which resembles Batman's chest symbol.

References

Hypoptopomatini
Catfish of South America
Taxa named by Pablo Cesar Lehmann-Albornoz
Fish described in 2006